Gary Hall (born 27 March 1990) is a British judoka.

Judo career
He competed for England in the men's 90 kg event at the 2014 Commonwealth Games where he won a bronze medal.

He is a two times champion of Great Britain, winning the middleweight division at the British Judo Championships in 2014 and 2015.

References 

1990 births
Living people
English male judoka
Commonwealth Games bronze medallists for England
Judoka at the 2014 Commonwealth Games
Commonwealth Games medallists in judo
Medallists at the 2014 Commonwealth Games